The 1986 South Carolina United States Senate election was held on November 4, 1986 to select the U.S. Senator from the state of South Carolina.  Popular incumbent Democratic Senator Fritz Hollings easily defeated Republican challenger Henry McMaster to win his fifth (his fourth full) term. This is also the last US Senate election in South Carolina where the Democrat won with a double-digit margin.

Republican primary
The Republican primary campaign pitted U.S. Attorney Henry McMaster against Henry Jordan, a social conservative supported by televangelist Pat Robertson and many Christian activists.

Candidates
 Henry Jordan, surgeon
 Henry McMaster, U.S. Attorney

Results

General election

Candidates
 Ray Hillyard (A)
 Fritz Hollings (D), incumbent U.S. Senator
 Henry McMaster (R), U.S. Attorney
 Steven Vandervelde (L)

Campaign
The race was not seriously contested and was not a target by the Republicans.  With little financial assistance, McMaster was unable to mount a credible challenge to Hollings' re-election in what became a difficult year for Republicans.

Results

 
 

|-
| 
 | colspan=5 |Democratic hold
|-

See also
 List of United States senators from South Carolina
 1986 United States Senate elections
 1986 South Carolina gubernatorial election

References

 

1986
South Carolina
1986 South Carolina elections